Patricia Doyle Corner is an American-New Zealand academic. She was full professor of strategic entrepreneurship at the Auckland University of Technology before moving to University of British Columbia.

Academic career

After a 1993 PhD titled Related acquisition choice quality : an interpretive process explanation at Arizona State University, she moved to the University of Waikato, rising to full professor then  University of British Columbia.

Selected works 
 Corner, Patricia Doyle, and Marcus Ho. "How opportunities develop in social entrepreneurship." Entrepreneurship Theory and Practice 34, no. 4 (2010): 635–659.
 Corner, Patricia Doyle, Angelo J. Kinicki, and Barbara W. Keats. "Integrating organizational and individual information processing perspectives on choice." Organization Science 5, no. 3 (1994): 294–308.
 Corner, James L., and Patricia D. Corner. "Characteristics of decisions in decision analysis practice." Journal of the Operational Research Society 46, no. 3 (1995): 304–314.
 Singh, Smita, Patricia Doyle Corner, and Kathryn Pavlovich. "Failed, not finished: A narrative approach to understanding venture failure stigmatization." Journal of Business Venturing 30, no. 1 (2015): 150–166.
 Corner, Patricia Doyle. "Workplace spirituality and business ethics: Insights from an eastern spiritual tradition." Journal of Business Ethics 85, no. 3 (2009): 377–389.

References

Living people
New Zealand women academics
Arizona State University alumni
Academic staff of the Auckland University of Technology
Academic staff of the University of British Columbia
Year of birth missing (living people)
New Zealand women writers